Presidential elections were held in Iceland on 25 June 1988. The result was a victory for the incumbent president Vigdís Finnbogadóttir, who received 94.6% of the vote. The election marked the first time a sitting president was challenged in an election.

Results

References

1988 in Iceland
Presidential elections in Iceland
Iceland
Iceland